Andrew David Lapthorne (born 11 October 1990) is a British wheelchair tennis player. He took up wheelchair tennis in 2005, and entered the quad division in 2008. He is active in both singles and doubles tournaments, and has 13 multiple grand slam titles in singles and doubles. He competed at his first Summer Paralympics at London 2012 in the quad singles and in the quad doubles, in which he won a silver medal and is now a three-time Paralympic medallist and British no.1 Quad tennis player, who started playing wheelchair tennis at the age of ten.

Early life
Lapthorne has cerebral palsy, and uses a wheelchair. He can walk for limited periods, but not very far and the condition has left him unable to straighten his arms fully. He joined a disabled football team at the age of eight, and also tried wheelchair basketball.

Tennis career
Lapthorne took up the sport full-time in 2005 after playing at a sports camp for people in wheelchairs. He was spotted by coaches from the Tennis Federation and became a professional player. In 2008, he registered in the quad division and in his first quad tournament he reached the semi-final of the 2008 Nottingham Indoor event. In 2009 he reached the finals of his first tournaments including defeating Johan Andersson, who was the silver medallist at the 2008 Summer Paralympics, in the quarter finals of the Florida Open.

Lapthorne began teaming up with Peter Norfolk, to compete in the quad doubles. They appeared at the Florida Open in 2009 for the first time, and defeated the reigning Olympic champions in the first round before going on to win the tournament. Lapthorne won his first singles title during the same year, at the Wroclaw Cup, and also won the singles title at Prague Cup Czech Indoor resulting in completing his first full season as a quad player ranked ninth in the world.

In 2010, Lapthorne won both the Melbourne Open singles titles and doubles alongside Norfolk. He reached the final of the Sydney Open and regularly appeared in the quarter finals of the year's Super Series tournaments. His world ranking in 2010 improved to number six, and he won the end of season Camozzi Doubles Masters, teaming with Norfolk once more. In 2011, he appeared at a Grand Slam for the first time, winning the doubles tournament with Norfolk which increased their ranking to number one in the world. It was the first occasion that an all British pair had won a quad doubles grand slam, as the duo defeated David Wagner and Nick Taylor by 6–3, 6–3, to win the title. It marked the fourth victory that Lapthorne and Norfolk had made during the previous two seasons over Wagner and Taylor, who are the reigning Paralympics champions. They retained the title a year later.

Lapthorne was selected for the Great Britain squad for the 2012 Summer Paralympics in London in both the quad singles and quad doubles tennis events. Channel 4 featured Norfolk in a special aired on 7 August 2012, prior to the London Paralympics. Lapthorne was also featured in the special resulting in The Daily Telegraph describing him as "the young pretender, talented, aggressive and gobby in the extreme". At the time of the Paralympics, he was ranked fourth in the world in the singles, and number one in the doubles with Norfolk. In the singles, he was drawn against Anders Hard in the first round, while he and Norfolk received a bye to the semi-finals of the doubles tournament. He was knocked out of the singles competition in the first round by Hard, with a score of 7–5, 3–6, 3–6. However, in the doubles tournament he reached the final against Taylor and Wagner. Before the match he received good luck messages from the West Ham football team, and fellow tennis player Andy Murray. The British pair lost the match, 2–6, 7–5, 2–6, but Lapthorne and Norfolk won a silver medal each in the process.

In 2014 Lapthorne went on to win the US open singles title. In January 2019, Lapthorne and partner David Wagner were beaten in the quad wheelchair doubles final in the Australian Open.

Personal life
Lapthorne is an ambassador of Brentford F.C. He is a fan of West Ham United F.C. He lives in Eastcote, Greater London.

References

External links
 
 
 
 

1990 births
Living people
British male tennis players
British wheelchair tennis players
Paralympic wheelchair tennis players of Great Britain
Paralympic medalists in wheelchair tennis
Paralympic silver medalists for Great Britain
Paralympic bronze medalists for Great Britain
Wheelchair tennis players at the 2012 Summer Paralympics
Wheelchair tennis players at the 2016 Summer Paralympics
Medalists at the 2012 Summer Paralympics
Medalists at the 2016 Summer Paralympics
Sportspeople with cerebral palsy
Tennis people from Greater London
ITF number 1 ranked wheelchair tennis players
21st-century British people